Romy Eggimann (born 29 September 1995) is a Swiss ice hockey forward who plays with the Ladies Team Lugano in the Swiss Women's Hockey League A (SWHL A) and internationally for the Swiss women's national team. She has represented Switzerland at the Winter Olympics in 2014 and won the bronze medal after defeating  in the bronze medal playoff.

References

1995 births
Living people
People from Emmental District
Swiss women's ice hockey forwards
Ice hockey players at the 2014 Winter Olympics
Medalists at the 2014 Winter Olympics
Olympic bronze medalists for Switzerland
Olympic ice hockey players of Switzerland
Olympic medalists in ice hockey
Sportspeople from the canton of Bern
21st-century Swiss women